Warren Pierce McGuirk (January 2, 1906 – February 19, 1981) was an American football player and coach and college athletics administrator. He played college football at Boston College as a tackle, serving as captain of the undefeated 1928 Boston College Eagles football team. After graduating from Boston College in 1929, McGuirk played professional football for two season in the National Football League (NFL) with the Providence Steamrollers. From 1931 to 1942, he was head football coach and director of physical education at Malden High School in Malden, Massachusetts. During World War II, McGuirk served in the United States Navy, reaching the rank of commander before being discharged in 1946. He was appointed the athletics director at the University of Massachusetts Amherst (UMass) in 1948, a post he occupied until his retirement on January 1, 1972.

McGuirk died on February 19, 1981, at New England Medical Center in Boston. His wife died February 8 of that year. The Warren McGuirk Alumni Stadium at UMass is named in his honor.

References

External links
 
 

1906 births
1981 deaths
American football tackles
Boston College Eagles football players
Providence Steam Roller players
UMass Minutemen and Minutewomen athletic directors
University of Massachusetts Amherst faculty
High school football coaches in Massachusetts
Sportspeople from Boston
Coaches of American football from Massachusetts
Players of American football from Boston